Leontius I may refer to:

Leontius (usurper), Roman emperor, sometimes Leontius I
Leontius I, Archbishop of Bordeaux post 520
Leontius I of Jerusalem, Patriarch of Jerusalem in 911–928